Menahem or Menachem (from a Hebrew word המנחם meaning "the consoler" or "comforter";  Meniḫîmme [me-ni-ḫi-im-me]; Greek: Μεναέμ Manaem in the Septuagint,  ΜεναένManaen in Aquila; ; full name: , Menahem son of Gadi) was the sixteenth king of the northern Israelite Kingdom of Israel. He was the son of Gadi, and the founder of the dynasty known as the House of Gadi or House of Menahem.

In the Bible
When Shallum conspired against and assassinated Zechariah in Samaria, and set himself upon the throne of the northern kingdom, Menahem—who, like Shallum, had served as a captain in Zechariah's army—refused to recognize the murderous usurper. Menahem marched from Tirzah to Samaria, about six miles westwards and laid siege to Samaria. He took the city, murdered Shallum a month into his reign, and set himself upon the throne. According to Josephus, he was a general of the army of Israel.

He brutally suppressed a revolt at Tiphsah. He destroyed the city and put all its inhabitants to death, even ripping open the pregnant women.

The author of the Books of Kings describes his rule as one of cruelty and oppression. The author is apparently synopsizing the "annals of the Kings of Israel", and gives scant details of Menahem's reign.

Chronology
Menahem became king of Israel in the thirty-ninth year of the reign of Azariah, king of Judah, and reigned for ten years. According to the chronology of Kautsch, he ruled from 743 BC; according to Schrader, from 745 to 736 BC. William F. Albright has dated his reign from 745 to 738 BC, while E. R. Thiele offers the dates 752–742 BC.

Menahem seems to have died a natural death, and was succeeded by his son Pekahiah.

Tributary of Assyria
Tiglath-Pileser III of Assyria began his reign in 745 BC three years before Menahem became king of Israel.

During Menahem's reign, the Assyrians first entered the kingdom of Israel, and had also invaded Aram Damascus to the north-east: "And Pul, king of the Assyrians, came into the land". The Assyrians may have been invited into Israel by the Assyrian party. Hosea speaks of the two anti-Israelite parties, the Egyptian and Assyrian.

To maintain independence, Menahem was forced to pay a tribute of a thousand talents of silver —which is about 37 tons (about 34 metric tons) of silver. Pul was probably his personal name and the one that first reached Israel. Tiglath-Pileser records this tribute in one of his inscriptions (ANET 283).
 
To pay the tribute, Menahem exacted fifty shekels of silver—about 1 pounds or 0.6 kg—from all the mighty men of wealth of the kingdom. To collect this amount, there would have had to be at the time some 60,000 "that were mighty and rich" in the kingdom. After receiving the tribute, Tiglath-Pileser returned to Assyria. However, from that time the kingdom of Israel was a tributary of Assyria; and when Pekah some ten years later refused to pay any more tribute, it started a sequence of events which led to the destruction of the kingdom and the deportation of its population.

See also
List of biblical figures identified in extra-biblical sources

References

Sources

8th-century BC Kings of Israel
House of Gadi
Leaders who took power by coup
Biblical murderers